Liana Mirashnichenka (born 15 December 1988) is a Belarusian football midfielder currently playing for FC Minsk.

Honours 
FC Minsk
Winner
 Belarusian Premier League (2): 2013, 2014
 Belarusian Women's Cup (2): 2013, 2014
 Belarusian Women's Super Cup: 2014

Runners-up
 Belarusian Premier League: 2012
 Belarusian Women's Cup: 2012
 Belarusian Women's Super Cup: 2012

External links 
 

1988 births
Living people
Belarusian women's footballers
FC Minsk (women) players
Women's association football midfielders
Belarus women's international footballers